John Mayall Plays John Mayall is a live album and the first release by John Mayall & the Bluesbreakers, issued in 1965 on Decca Records. It was recorded live at the Klooks Kleek club in West Hampstead, London, on 7 December 1964. Guitarist Roger Dean stated that sound cables were run for 100 yards out of the window of the club to Decca Studios, which was two buildings away.

Track listing
All tracks written by John Mayall except where otherwise indicated.

 "Crawling Up a Hill" - 2:21
 "I Wanna Teach You Everything" - 3:05
 "When I'm Gone" (Smokey Robinson) - 3:08
 "I Need Your Love" (Walter Spriggs, Willie Spriggs) - 4:08
 "The Hoot Owl" - 2:35
 "R&B Time" 
a) "Night Train" (Jimmy Forrest, Lewis C. Simpkins, Oscar Washington) / 
b) "Lucille" (Al Collins, Richard Penniman) - 2:15
 "Crocodile Walk" - 2:26
 "What's the Matter with You" - 2:34
 "Doreen" - 2:46
 "Runaway" - 2:25
 "Heartache" - 2:57
 "Chicago Line" - 4:10

2006 Decca Remastered Edition bonus tracks
 "Crawling Up a Hill" - 2:15
 "Mr. James" - 2:49
 "Crocodile Walk" - 2:14
 "Blues City Shakedown" - 2:22
 "My Baby Is Sweeter" - 2:59

Personnel
John Mayall & the Bluesbreakers
John Mayall – vocals, harmonica, "cembalett" (Cembalet electric piano), organ, 9-string guitar
Roger Dean – guitar
John McVie – bass guitar
Hughie Flint – drums
with:
Nigel Stanger – tenor saxophone, slide saxophone

References

John Mayall albums
1965 live albums
Decca Records live albums
Live blues rock albums
Albums produced by Tony Clarke (producer)